Willy Otto Oskar Ley (October 2, 1906 – June 24, 1969) was a German and American science writer and proponent of cryptozoology.  The crater Ley on the far side of the Moon is named in his honor.

Early life and Berlin years
Willy Otto Oskar Ley was the son of Julius Otto Ley, a traveling merchant, and Frida May, the daughter of a Lutheran sexton. Ley grew up in his native Berlin during the First World War under the supervision of two aunts.  When war erupted his father was in Great Britain.  Consequently, he spent the remainder of the war at a detention camp on the Isle of Man.  Meanwhile, his mother worked as milliner in a distant city in Germany.

As Ley later recalled he "grew up, so to speak, in the shadow of the Museum of Natural History in Berlin".  When his school teacher asked him to compose an essay on the subject "What Do I Want to Be When I Am Grown and Why?", Ley responded: "I want to be an explorer." His teacher thought this silly, but Ley was unconvinced.

At the University of Berlin, he studied astronomy, physics, zoology and paleontology. Ley explained, "I was never quite sure whether my studies would earn me the title of 'zoologist' or 'geologist', but I kept exploring, in a manner of speaking, looking especially into such corners as others had neglected."  He then became interested in spaceflight after reading Hermann Oberth's book Die Rakete zu den Planetenräumen (The Rocket into Interplanetary Space).  Although it was a difficult technical book, Ley worked through the calculations and concluded that outer space would soon become the next great frontier of human exploration. Ley was so convinced by Oberth's book that he sat down at the age of 19 to write a popularization of its contents.  He also began corresponding with every known rocket enthusiast in Europe, including Oberth himself.  After publishing Die Fahrt ins Weltall (Travel in Outer Space) in 1926, Ley became one of the first members of Germany's amateur rocket group, the Verein für Raumschiffahrt (VfR – "Spaceflight Society") in 1927 and wrote extensively for its journal, Die Rakete (The Rocket). Ley would eventually become the group's Vice-President during a time when it had no active President.  Meanwhile, he was writing hundreds of short articles about rockets for German and foreign newspapers.

Due to the influence of Ley and other popular science writers, such as Max Valier, Germans witnessed a short-lived "rocketry fad" in Berlin.  From exhibits at public locations to large spectator events, such as Fritz von Opel's rocket-car stunts, the German public was excited about both the future possibilities of space travel and the potential for new "weapons of wonder" that could revive the German Empire.

The "rocketry fad" culminated with Fritz Lang's 1929 film Die Frau im Mond (Woman in the Moon), which became the first realistic depiction of spaceflight in cinematic history. Although Oberth is often credited as the main technical consultant to the film, Ley's role was of central importance. Oberth was tasked with building a small rocket to be launched at the film's premiere.  This project never materialized.  However, Ley's work on the movie did.  As director Fritz Lang later recalled, "The work he had done as consultant and advisor ... was amazing.  The models of the spaceship, really a highly advanced model of a rocket, the trajectories and the orbits of the modular capsule from the earth, around the earth and to the moon and back ... were so accurate that in 1937 the Gestapo confiscated not only all models of the spaceship but also all foreign prints of the picture."

Despite the many successes the "rocketry fad" could not be sustained during the early years of the Great Depression.  The German public lost interest amidst economic turmoil.  Meanwhile, some rocket researchers formed closer ties with the military, which greatly expanded under the leadership of Wernher von Braun. With the collapse of the VfR, the rise of a culture of necessary secrecy and the loss of public enthusiasm, Ley grew discouraged. He continued to write articles for the domestic and foreign press while he stayed in touch with close friends.  Yet for the most part, Ley turned back to his original scientific interests, while writing a biography of Conrad Gessner (the "father" of modern zoology).  To make ends meet, Ley also worked as a clerk and then manager at a Berlin bank.

When the Nazis seized power, Ley's situation became increasingly desperate. He was horrified by National Socialism, its ideology and its style of violent politics.  His perception of political events can be inferred from a short science fiction story called "Fog," which Ley wrote in 1940 under the pen name of Robert Wiley.  It is a biographical narrative about an office manager dealing with the everyday effects of totalitarianism. Although the story is set in New York City during a failed Communist revolution, it is clear that Ley is retelling his personal experiences in Berlin. In fact, John Campbell, the editor of Astounding, requested that Ley center the narrative on his personal experience.  Ley not only disliked the irrational nature of German politics, but he also associated the Nazis with the rise of "Pseudo-science."  To make matters worse, Ley had an established reputation as an international scientist, who openly shared and popularized technical information about rocketry, while his articles continued to be republished by foreign newspapers throughout 1934.

In January 1935, Ley used company stationery to write a letter that authorized his vacation in London.  Carrying only his favorite books, a few changes of clothing and travel documentation, Ley fled Germany for Great Britain and ultimately the United States.

In the United States

In 1936, he supervised operations of two rocket planes carrying mail at Greenwood Lake, NY. Ley was an avid reader of science fiction, and began publishing scientific articles in American science fiction magazines, beginning with "The Dawn of the Conquest of Space" in the March 1937 issue of Astounding Stories.  In the February 1937 issue of that same magazine, he had published a science fiction short story "At the Perihelion" under the pseudonym Robert Wiley, which was later reprinted as "A Martian Adventure" in the 1962 anthology Great Science Fiction by Scientists (Collier Books, Groff Conklin, ed.). He was a member of science fiction fandom as well, attending science fiction conventions, and was eventually a Guest of Honor at Philcon II, the 1953 World Science Fiction Convention.

In 1940 Ley joined the staff of PM.  In the winter of 1941 he met the paper's fitness columnist and model, Olga Feldmann (1912–2001).  They became engaged on December 11 and married on Christmas Eve.

His book Rockets – the Future of Travel Beyond the Stratosphere (1944) describes the early rockets at VfR and more futuristic projects to reach the moon using a 3-stage rocket "as high as 1/3 of the Empire State Building" – a very good estimate of the height of the Saturn V rocket designed 20 years later.  His works from the 1950s and '60s are regarded as classics of popular science and include The Conquest of Space 1949 (with Chesley Bonestell), The Conquest of the Moon (with Wernher von Braun and Fred Whipple, 1953), and Beyond the Solar System (1964). His book, Rockets, Missiles, and Space Travel, (1957) was cited in the Space Handbook: Astronautics and its Applications, a staff report of the Select Committee on Astronautics and Space Exploration of the U.S. House of Representatives, which provided non-technical information about spaceflight to U.S. policy makers. Ley had a regular science column called "For Your Information" in Galaxy Science Fiction from March 1952 until his death. Ley participated in "Man in Space", a 1955 episode of Disneyland which explained spaceflight to a large television audience. Fellow Galaxy columnist Floyd C. Gale wrote that Ley "has become as familiar to TV audiences as Howdy Doody". In the late 1950s, he designed for Monogram models a range of space vehicles. The kits included informational booklets on space travel written by Ley. He also consulted for the Tom Corbett, Space Cadet series of children's science fiction books and TV series, as well as the 1959 feature film entitled "The Space Explorers." Robert A. Heinlein honored him by mentioning a future "Leyport" on the Moon in his 1952 juvenile novel The Rolling Stones. Likewise and long after his death, Larry Niven and Steven Barnes named a future Space Shuttle the “Willy Ley” in their 1982 novel The Descent of Anansi.

In 1954, Ley wrote Engineers' Dreams in which he discussed 'Seven Future Wonders of the World'. These included accurate predictions of the Channel Tunnel between Britain and France and commercial wind, solar and geothermal power. Other schemes were less practical: damming the River Jordan to provide power and irrigation to Israel/Palestine and the plans of fellow German Herman Sörgel to drain the Mediterranean to link Europe with Africa and create the new continent of Atlantropa.

He was a member of the all-male literary banqueting club the Trap Door Spiders, which served as the basis of Isaac Asimov's fictional group of mystery solvers the Black Widowers.

Ley died at the age of 62 on June 24, 1969 – less than a month before men first landed on the Moon – in his home in Jackson Heights, Queens, where he had lived with his family since the mid-1950s.

Cryptozoology
Ley was best known for his books on rocketry and related topics, but he also wrote a number of books about cryptozoology, a pseudoscience. In 1949, Ley published an article Do Prehistoric Monsters Still Exist? which popularised the living dinosaur idea and included a discussion on the Mokele-mbembe legend. Ley collected much source material on anomalous animals for his writings. Science historian Brian Regal has noted that Ley "copied entire chapters of Heuvelmans's On the Track of Unknown Animals for his own reference."

Bibliography

References and notes

Further reading
  Buss, Jared S. Willy Ley: Prophet of the Space Age (University Press of Florida, 2017) online review

External links

 
 
 
 
 
 Disneyland - Man in Space - Part 1 of 4.  Video in which Dr. Ley explains principles of rocketry at 11:36
 Willy Ley Collection, The University of Alabama in Huntsville Archives and Special Collections

1906 births
1969 deaths
20th-century American essayists
20th-century American male writers
20th-century American physicists
20th-century German inventors
20th-century German physicists
American male non-fiction writers
American technology writers
Analog Science Fiction and Fact people
Cryptozoologists
Engineers from Berlin
German aerospace engineers
German emigrants to the United States
German male non-fiction writers
German rocket scientists
German spaceflight pioneers
German technology writers
People from Jackson Heights, Queens
Scientists from New York (state)
Space advocates